In mathematics, Faulhaber's formula, named after the early 17th century mathematician Johann Faulhaber, expresses the sum of the p-th powers of the first n positive integers

 	
as a (p + 1)th-degree polynomial function of n, the coefficients involving Bernoulli numbers Bj, in the form submitted by Jacob Bernoulli and published in 1713:
 	
 
where  is a falling factorial.

History 
Faulhaber's formula is also called Bernoulli's formula. Faulhaber did not know the properties of the coefficients later discovered by Bernoulli. Rather, he knew at least the first 17 cases, as well as the existence of the Faulhaber polynomials for odd powers described below.

A rigorous proof of these formulas and Faulhaber's assertion that such formulas would exist for all odd powers took until , two centuries later.

Faulhaber polynomials
The term Faulhaber polynomials is used by some authors to refer to something other than the polynomial sequence given above.  Faulhaber observed that if p is odd, then

is a polynomial function of

In particular:

 

 

 

 

 

The first of these identities (the case p = 3) is known as Nicomachus's theorem.

More generally, 

Some authors call the polynomials in a on the right-hand sides of these identities Faulhaber polynomials.  These polynomials are divisible by  because the Bernoulli number  is 0 for odd .

Faulhaber also knew that if a sum for an odd power is given by

then the sum for the even power just below is given by

Note that the polynomial in parentheses is the derivative of the polynomial above with respect to a.

Since a = n(n + 1)/2, these formulae show that for an odd power (greater than 1), the sum is a polynomial in n having factors n2 and (n + 1)2, while for an even power the polynomial has factors n, n + ½ and n + 1.

Summae Potestatum

In 1713, Jacob Bernoulli published under the title Summae Potestatum an expression of the sum of the  powers of the  first integers as a th-degree polynomial function of , with coefficients involving numbers , now called Bernoulli numbers:
 

Introducing also the first two Bernoulli numbers (which Bernoulli did not), the previous formula becomes

using the Bernoulli number of the first kind for which 

For example, as

Faulhaber himself did not know the formula in this form, but only computed the first seventeen polynomials; the general form was established with the discovery of the Bernoulli numbers (see History section).  The derivation of Faulhaber's formula is available in The Book of Numbers by John Horton Conway and Richard K. Guy.

There is also a similar (but somehow simpler) expression: using the idea of telescoping and the binomial theorem, one gets Pascal's identity:
 
This in particular yields the examples below – e.g., take  to get the first example. In a similar fashion we also find

Examples

 (the triangular numbers)

 (the square pyramidal numbers)

 (the triangular numbers squared)

From examples to matrix theorem
From the previous examples we get:

Writing these polynomials as a product between matrices gives

Surprisingly, inverting the matrix of polynomial coefficients yields something more familiar:

In the inverted matrix, Pascal's triangle can be recognized, without the last element of each row, and with alternating signs. 

and also

This is because it is evident that
 and that therefore polynomials of degree  of the form  subtracted the monomial difference  they become . 

This is true for every order,  that is, for each positive integer , one has  and 
Thus, it is possible to obtain the coefficients of the polynomials of the sums of powers of successive integers without resorting to the numbers of Bernoulli but by inverting the matrix easily obtained from the triangle of Pascal.

Proof with exponential generating function
Let 

denote the sum under consideration for integer 

Define the following exponential generating function with (initially) indeterminate 

We find 

This is an entire function in  so that  can be taken to be any complex number.

We next recall the exponential generating function for the Bernoulli polynomials  

where  denotes the Bernoulli number with the convention .

It follows immediately that

for all .

Alternate expressions
 By relabelling we find the alternative expression 
 We may also expand  in terms of the Bernoulli polynomials to find  which implies  Since  whenever  is odd, the factor  may be removed when .
 It can also be expressed in terms of Stirling numbers of the second kind and falling factorials as   This is due to the definition of the Stirling numbers of the second kind as mononomials in terms of falling factorials, and the behaviour of falling factorials under the indefinite sum.
 Faulhaber's formula was generalized by Guo and Zeng to a -analog.

Relationship to Riemann zeta function

Using , one can write

Heuristically, this suggests that 

This result agrees with the value of the Riemann zeta function  for negative integers  on appropriately analytically continuing .

Umbral form

In the classical umbral calculus one formally treats the indices j in a sequence Bj as if they were exponents, so that, always considering the variant , in this case we can apply the binomial theorem and say

In the modern umbral calculus, one considers the linear functional T on the vector space of polynomials in a variable b given by

Then one can say

See also
Polynomials calculating sums of powers of arithmetic progressions

Notes

External links

 
  A very rare book, but Knuth has placed a photocopy in the Stanford library, call number QA154.8 F3 1631a f MATH.
  (Winner of a Lester R. Ford Award)

A visual proof for the sum of squares and cubes.

Finite differences